Akobo is a town in South Sudan.

Location
It is located in Akobo County, in the northeastern part of South Sudan, near the International border with Ethiopia.

Population
According to the Sudanese census, which was boycotted by the South Sudanese government, Akobo County's population was 400,210 in 2008.
The land is inhabited by Lou Nuer and Anyuak people.

Transportation
From Akobo, one road leads northwest to Padoi and  Walgak towards Waat. Another road leads south to Kong Kong and Pibor. The town is also served by Akobo Airport.

Notable landmarks
Notable landmarks in the town of Akobo, include the following:

 The offices of Akobo Town Council
 The headquarters of Akobo County Administration
 Three rivers - The Geni River to the West of Akobo town. The Pibor River and the Akobo River to the east of town. River Akobo empties into River Pibor at the border town of Old Akobo. Akobo town is located at the western bank of Akobo River
Akobo has a clinic which was built in 1911 and a hospital which was built between 1976 and 1983. Akobo has three primary schools and one intermediate high school.
 Akobo Heritage and Memorial University - An institution of higher learning
 Akobo Airport - A civilian airport
 Akobo has Akobo Youth Association office

See also
 Akobo County
 Akobo Airport
 Jonglei State

References

External links
  Location of Akobo At Google Maps

Populated places in Jonglei State